Alfred Buntru (15 January 1887 – 23 January 1974) was a German academic and member of the Nazi Party. Born in Sankt Blasien in the Waldshut district of the Grand Duchy of Baden, he was educated at the Karlsruhe Institute of Technology. Buntru later became a professor of hydraulic engineering and a deputy Reichsdozentenführer (English: "Reich lecturer leader"). He joined the Nazi Party in 1937 and the Schutzstaffel (SS) in 1938, attaining the SS rank of Oberführer. As part of his SS membership, he was involved in the Spitzeldienste, the network of political informants set up by the Nazi Party's intelligence organization, the Sicherheitsdienst (SD). Buntru survived the Second World War, and died in Aachen in 1974 at the age of 87.

References

External links

Entries on Alfred Buntru from the Historische Kommission München (in German)

1887 births
1974 deaths
People from Sankt Blasien
People from the Grand Duchy of Baden
Nazi Party members
SS-Oberführer
Engineers from Baden-Württemberg
Hydraulic engineers
Karlsruhe Institute of Technology alumni